Joyce Hens Green (born November 13, 1928) is a senior United States district judge of the United States District Court for the District of Columbia. Green was nominated by President Jimmy Carter on March 6, 1979, to a seat vacated by Howard F. Corcoran. She was confirmed by the United States Senate on May 10, 1979, and received commission on May 11, 1979. She assumed senior status on July 1, 1995.

Education and career

Born in 1928 in New York City, New York, Green graduated from the University of Maryland, College Park, receiving a Bachelor of Arts degree in 1949. She entered the University of Maryland School of Law and transferred to the  George Washington University Law School, receiving a Juris Doctor from that institution in two years, in 1951. She also received an honorary Doctor of Laws (LL.D.) from George Washington University in 1994 and has been named a Distinguished Alumnus of Towson High School. Green practiced law in the District of Columbia and Virginia until she was appointed Associate Judge of the Superior Court of the District of Columbia in 1968, where she served for over a decade.

Federal judicial service

On March 6, 1979, President Jimmy Carter nominated Green to be a United States District Judge of the United States District Court for the District of Columbia, to a seat vacated by Judge Howard Francis Corcoran. She was confirmed by the United States Senate on May 10, 1979 and received her commission on May 11, 1979. She took senior status on July 1, 1995 and was succeeded by Henry H. Kennedy Jr., who had also succeeded her on the Superior Court bench. Green was a member of the United States Foreign Intelligence Surveillance Court (FISC) from May 1988 until May 1995, and served as its Presiding Judge from May 1990 until May 1995.

Professional affiliations

Green is a member of the American Bar Association, the American Judicature Society, the Federal Bar Association, the National Association of Women Judges, and the Women's Bar Association of the District of Columbia. She served as the President of the Women's Bar Association of the District of Columbia from 1962-1963. She served as the chair of the National Conference of Trial Judges from 1997–1998. She has served as an instructor at the Militia Academy in Minsk, Republic of Belarus for the U.S. Information Agency and serves on the board of advisors for the George Washington University Law School.

On June 16, 2004 Green received an American Inns of Court Professionalism Award. She has received the George Washington University's Professional Achievement Award (1975); been named "Woman Lawyer of the Year" by the Women's Bar Association of the District of Columbia (1979); and received a certificate of appreciation from the Chief Justice of the United States (1995).

Significant cases

IRS v. The Church of Scientology

In 1992, Judge Green ruled in favor of the Church of Scientology in the case of Church of Scientology v. Internal Revenue Service on a pretrial motion for summary judgment.

Release of BCCI's frozen assets

On September 1, 1995 Green Ordered $393 million seized from the Bank of Credit and Commerce International turned over to the bank's victims. BCCI had been involved in criminal activity and its assets had been freed in 1992. Green had heard, and ruled on, three challenges to the release of the seized funds.

FEC v. The Christian Coalition

Green ruled against the Federal Election Commission in Federal Election Commission v. The Christian Coalition Civil Action No. 96-1781 Opinion & Order; and Judgment, filed August 2, 1999. The FEC had challenged the propriety of the Christian Coalition's distribution of voter guides, on the grounds it had been too closely tied to large corporate donors.

But, Green's 108-page judgment had supported the FEC in two instances; when the Christian Coalition had broken FEC guidelines in their explicit advocacy of the re-election of Newt Gingrich; and when the Christian Coalition had handed over their membership list to Senate candidate Oliver North.

In re Guantanamo Detainee Cases

Following the United States Supreme Court ruling in Rasul v. Bush (2004), which determined that detainees had the right of habeas corpus and due process to challenge their detention before an impartial tribunal, many habeas corpus cases were filed on behalf of detainees at Guantanamo Bay detention camp. On September 15, 2004, Judge Green was appointed the coordinating judge for all Guantanamo Bay habeas corpus cases.

On January 31, 2005, Judge Green ruled that:

(1) detainees had the fundamental Fifth Amendment right not to be deprived of liberty without due process of law; 
(2) complaints stated a claim for violation of due process based on Combatant Status Review Tribunal's ("CSRT") extensive reliance on classified information in its resolution of "enemy combatant" status of detainees, the detainees' inability to review that information, and the prohibition of assistance by counsel jointly deprived detainees of sufficient notice of the factual bases for their detention and denied them a fair opportunity to challenge their incarceration; 
(3) due process required that CSRTs sufficiently consider whether the evidence upon which the tribunal relied in making its "enemy combatant" determinations had been obtained through torture; 
(4) complaints stated a claim for violation of due process based on the government's employment of an overly broad definition of "enemy combatant" subject to indefinite detention; and 
(5) Geneva Conventions applied to the Taliban detainees, but not to members of the al Qaeda terrorist organization.

Notes
  Hon. Joyce Hens Green, American Inns of Court Professionalism Award, June 16, 2004
  Federal Court releases $393 million fdr BCCI victims, Department of Justice, September 1, 1995
  Federal Election Commission v. Christian Coalition, United States Court of the District of Columbia, August 3, 1999
  A Victory for Christian Coalition, Washington Post, August 3, 1999
  Resolution of the Executive Session, United States Court of the District of Columbia, September 15, 2004, resolution assigning Green the senior role in reviewing Guantanamo detainees legal requests
  Judge Rules Detainee Tribunals Illegal, Washington Post, February 1, 2005
  Judge Backs Guantanamo Detainee Challenges: Judge Allows Some Guantanamo Detainees to Challenge Confinement, Criticizes White House Policy, ABC News, January 31, 2005
  Judicial Wake-Up Call, Washington Post, February 1, 2005
  Righting wrongs for Guantanamo detainees, Salon (magazine), February 1, 2005
  Panel Ignored Evidence on Detainee: U.S. Military Intelligence, German Authorities Found No Ties to Terrorists, Washington Post, March 27, 2005
  Mustafa Aid Idir's dossier (.pdf)  from his CSRT, pages 26–27 of 53.

References

External links

 Judge Green's official bio
 Legends in the Law: A Conversation with Joyce Hens Green, District of Columbia Bar Report'', 1999
 

1928 births
20th-century American judges
American jurists
George Washington University Law School alumni
Judges of the United States District Court for the District of Columbia
Judges presiding over Guantanamo habeas petitions
Judges of the Superior Court of the District of Columbia
Living people
Lawyers from New York City
Towson High School alumni
United States district court judges appointed by Jimmy Carter
University of Maryland, College Park alumni
Virginia lawyers
Judges of the United States Foreign Intelligence Surveillance Court
Recipients of the Agency Seal Medal
21st-century American judges
20th-century American women judges
21st-century American women judges